The Government of Mauritius is the main authority of the executive power in the Republic of Mauritius. The head of the Government is the Prime Minister of Mauritius, who manages the main agenda of the Government and direct the ministers.

The 2015 Ibrahim Index of African Governance ranked Mauritius first in good governance. According to the 2015 Democracy Index compiled by the Economist Intelligence Unit that measures the state of democracy in 167 countries, Mauritius ranks 18th worldwide followed by Uruguay and United States and is the only African country with Full Democracy.

Legislature

The National Assembly is the legislative branch of the government of Mauritius. The Assembly is made up of 70 Members elected in 21 constituencies, of which Rodrigues Island is one.

Cabinet

Judiciary branch

Mauritius' Courts include the Supreme Court, the Court of Rodrigues, the Intermediate Court, the Industrial Court, the District Courts, the Bail and Remand Court, the Criminal and Mediation Court and the Commercial Court and the Children`s Court. The Chief Justice is head of the judiciary.

Local governments
Each city, town, village and district of Mauritius are administered, for the purposes of local government, by the local authorities; the municipal city councils, municipal councils, the district councils and the village councils.

See also

 Politics of Mauritius
 Government Portal of Mauritius

References

External links

 Mauritius Government portal

 
Politics of Mauritius
Political organisations based in Mauritius
Westminster system